Andromeda V is a dwarf spheroidal galaxy about 2.52 Mly away in the constellation  Andromeda.

Andromeda V was discovered by Armandroff et al. and published in 1998 after their analysis of the digitized version of the second Palomar Sky Survey.

The metallicity of Andromeda V is above the average metallicity to luminosity ratio of the Local Group's dwarf galaxies.

See also
 List of Andromeda's satellite galaxies

References

External links
 SEDS: Dwarf Spheroidal Galaxy Andromeda V
 SIMBAD: And V -- Galaxy

Dwarf spheroidal galaxies
3097824
Local Group
Andromeda Subgroup
Andromeda (constellation)